ERV Nene Hatun is a rescue and salvage ship, Turkey's first emergency response vessel (ERV). Owned and operated by the Directorate General of Coastal Safety, she was built in Yalova, launched in 2014, and commissioned in 2015.

History
The vessel was built for the Directorate General of Coastal Safety at Sefine Shipyard in Altınova, Yalova Province, Turkey. She was named Nene Hatun (1857–1955), a Turkish folk heroine, who became known for fighting in the Russo-Turkish War of 1877–1878, Costing 31.14 million, she was launched with a ceremony held on 24 October 2014. She was commissioned on 27 May 2015. She is the first emergency response vessel of Turkey.

Characteristics
She is operated by a crew of 45, and is capable of accommodating up to 20 marine accident victims.

The ship's emergency care hospital has 20 beds.

The deck crane's safe working load (SWL) is 12.5 t. She is able to carry up to  boom  containment oil spill. Her landing deck allows the landing and take-off of helicopters with weights up to 11 tons.

Service history
As of summer 2021, Nene Hatun has accomplished 25 total operations of diverse nature from her commissioning in 2015.

On 28 January 2021, she participated in a salvage operation for M/V Petra Star, a Russian bulk carrier in ballast en route from Istanbul to Port Kavkaz, which ran aground due to engine failure in stormy weather conditions at the northern end of Istanbul Strait  in Black Sea.

By March 2021, it was announced that the emergency response ship was ready to take part in the salvage operation for  the container ship Ever Given, which  blocked the Suez Canal after grounding.

By early August 2021, she was deployed from Istanbul to the Ören neighborhood of the Milas district in Muğla Province, southwestern Turkey, where ongoing wildfires jeopardized the Yeniköy power station.

References

2014 ships
Ships built in Yalova
Rescue and salvage ships
Ships of Turkey
Marine salvage